Ezekiel 15 is the fifteenth chapter of the Book of Ezekiel in the Hebrew Bible or the Old Testament of the Christian Bible. This book contains the prophecies attributed to the prophet/priest Ezekiel, and is one of the Books of the Prophets. This chapter records a parable about the fate of the "useless"  grapevine as a symbol of the nation of Israel at that time. In the New King James Version, this chapter is sub-titled "The Outcast Vine"; according to commentator Andrew Davidson, it records "the uselessness of the wood of the vine".

Text
The original text was written in the Hebrew language. This chapter, the shortest in Ezekiel, is divided into 8 verses.

Textual witnesses
Some early manuscripts containing the text of this chapter in Hebrew are of the Masoretic Text tradition, which includes the Codex Cairensis (895), the Petersburg Codex of the Prophets (916), Aleppo Codex (10th century), Codex Leningradensis (1008).

There is also a translation into Koine Greek known as the Septuagint, made in the last few centuries BC. Extant ancient manuscripts of the Septuagint version include Codex Vaticanus (B; B; 4th century), Codex Alexandrinus (A; A; 5th century) and Codex Marchalianus (Q; Q; 6th century).

Verse 2
 Son of man, what is the vine tree more than any tree,
 or than a branch which is among the trees of the forest?
 "Son of man" (Hebrew: בן־אדם -): this phrase is used 93 times to address Ezekiel.

Verse 6
 Therefore thus saith the Lord God;
 As the vine tree among the trees of the forest,
 which I have given to the fire for fuel,
 so will I give the inhabitants of Jerusalem.
Application of the figure to Jerusalem.
 "Fuel" (Hebrew: אָכְלָה ; 'ok-lah): the Hebrew word actually means "food" as in "food of wild beast", but also used as "food of fire", that is "to be consumed by fire." The wood of the vine is worthy only when it produces grapes, otherwise it is useless, so it is thrown to the fire.

See also

Jerusalem
Vine
Related Bible parts: Psalm 80, Isaiah 5, John 15

Notes

References

Sources

External links

Jewish
Ezekiel 15 Hebrew with Parallel English
Ezekiel 15 Hebrew with Rashi's Commentary

Christian
Ezekiel 15 English Translation with Parallel Latin Vulgate

15